Rambehesht (Middle Persian: Rām Vahišt, New Persian: رام‌بهشت), also known as Denag (Middle Persian: Dēnag, New Persian: دینگ) was a 3rd-century Sasanian noblewoman from the Bazrangi family and the wife of Sasan, the eponymous ancestor of the Sasanian Dynasty (ruled 224-651) in Persia. She was the mother of Pabag and the grandmother of Ardashir I, the founder of the Sasanian Empire. According to Tabari she "possessed beauty and perfection".

References

Sources 
 
 
 

3rd-century Iranian people
3rd-century deaths
Women from the Sasanian Empire
3rd-century women